Vrícko (formerly ) is a village and municipality in Martin District in the Žilina Region of northern Slovakia.

History
In historical records the village was first mentioned in 1594.

Geography
The municipality lies at an altitude of 592 metres and covers an area of 29.575 km². It has a population of about 427 people.

External links
https://web.archive.org/web/20071116010355/http://www.statistics.sk/mosmis/eng/run.html 

Villages and municipalities in Martin District